Rediscovered is a posthumous 1998 Mississippi John Hurt compilation album released on Vanguard Records. It contains 23 songs that had previously been released on four of Hurt's earlier Vanguard albums: Today!, The Immortal Mississippi John Hurt, Last Sessions, and The Best of Mississippi John Hurt. The album's liner notes were written by Ed Ward.

Reviews

AllMusic's Matt Fink gave Rediscovered 4 out of 5 stars, writing that "These recordings are some of the last Hurt would make before his death, and are fine evidence of just how good he still was up until his last days."

Track listing
 Coffee Blues (John Hurt)
 I'm Satisfied (John Hurt)
 Make Me A Pallett On Your Floor (Public Domain)
 Monday Morning Blues (John Hurt)
 Since I've Laid My Burden Down (Public Domain)
 Stocktime (Buck Dance) (John Hurt)
 Hot Time In The Old Town Tonight (John Hurt)
 Richland Woman Blues (John Hurt)
 Keep On Knocking (John Hurt)
 Stagolee (John Hurt)
 Hop Joint (John Hurt)
 Funky Butt (John Hurt)
 It Ain't Nobody's Business (Public Domain)
 Salty Dog Blues (Wiley & Zeke Morris)
 Candy Man (John Hurt)
 You Are My Sunshine (Public Domain)
 I've Got The Blues And I Can't Be Satisfied (John Hurt)
 Nearer My God To Thee (Public Domain)
 Shortnin' Bread (Public Domain)
 Avalon, My Home Town (John Hurt)
 First Shot Missed Him (John Hurt)
 Let The Mermaids Flirt With Me (John Hurt)
 Talking Casey (John Hurt)
 Goodnight Irene (Huddie Ledbetter & John Lomax)

Personnel
Georgette Cartwright – Creative director
David Gahr - Photography
Mississippi John Hurt - Primary artist
Patrick Sky – Production Supervisor
Tom Vickers – Compilation Producer
Ed Ward – Liner notes 
Captain Jeff Zaraya – Engineer

References

1998 compilation albums
Mississippi John Hurt albums
Vanguard Records compilation albums